Karangtengah (or Central Karang) is a subdistrict (kecamatan) of Tangerang City, Banten, Indonesia.

It is an area in Indonesia between the borders of Jakarta and Banten province and has an area of approximately 10.47 km^2.

The Jakarta–Merak Toll Road crosses this subdistrict, connecting Jakarta to Merak in the Banten Province.

Toll Road Access

References

Tangerang
Districts of Banten